Rufus Lee Mayes (December 5, 1947 – January 9, 1990) was an American football offensive lineman in the National Football League (NFL) for the Chicago Bears, the Cincinnati Bengals, and the Philadelphia Eagles.

Early life
Mayes grew up in Toledo, Ohio, the son of Mr. and Mrs. Roosevelt Mayes, who also had three daughters. He attended Toledo Macomber High School in Toledo, where he led the team to the 1964 City League championship.

College career
Mayes attended Ohio State University and was a starting lineman for all 28 games he played for the Ohio State Buckeyes. His first two years, he was a tight end. After the Buckeyes had records of 4-5 and 6-3, respectively, in his first two-season, in his senior year he was switched to offensive tackle. The Buckeyes went 10-0, won the Big Ten championship, defeated the University of Southern California in the 1969 Rose Bowl and were named national champions.

Following his senior season, Mayes was named Second-Team All-American by the Associated Press.

Professional career
Mayes was selected in the first round (14th overall) of the 1969 NFL Draft by the Chicago Bears, for whom he played one season and 13 games.

In January 1970, he was traded by the Bears to the Cincinnati Bengals in return for defensive lineman Bill Staley and Harry Gunner. In 2004, the Chicago Tribune rated the trade of Mayes by the Bears to the Bengals the sixth-worst in Bears history.

Mayes' first season with the Bengals, 1970, was the Bengals' first in the NFL following the NFL/AFL merger. He proceeded to become a perennial starter at offensive left tackle for eight seasons with the Bengals. During his eight-year Bengals career, Mayes started 98 of the 110 games he played.

He played out his option and became a free agent. In June 1978, he signed with the Philadelphia Eagles, for whom he played his final NFL season. As a backup, he played in all 16 games.

Personal life
After football, Mayes was a marketing representative for Hewlett-Packard in Bellevue, Washington, and resided in Redmond, Washington, with his wife, Aishah, and son, Taysir.

In 1994, he was inducted into the Ohio State Men's Varsity "O" Hall of Fame

Rufus Mayes died on January 9, 1990, at age 42 of bacterial meningitis. His coach at Macomber High School, Steve  Contos, called Mayes "a great guy, a very bright, very concerned, happy, easy to get along with type of guy."

References

1947 births
1990 deaths
People from Memphis, Tennessee
American football offensive tackles
Ohio State Buckeyes football players
Chicago Bears players
Cincinnati Bengals players
Philadelphia Eagles players
Neurological disease deaths in the United States
Infectious disease deaths in the United States
Deaths from meningitis